John D. Perry (born c. 1935) is an American politician from New York.

Life
He was born about 1935 in Rochester, Monroe County, New York. He graduated B.A. in economics and M.A. in social science/education from Syracuse University. He also graduated M.S.T. in economics from the University of Missouri. Then he taught history and economics at several high schools and the Rochester Institute of Technology. He married Christine, and they have three children. They live in Brighton.

He was a Democratic member of the New York State Senate from 1975 to 1992, sitting in the 181st, 182nd, 183rd, 184th, 185th, 186th, 187th, 188th and 189th New York State Legislatures.

References

1935 births
Living people
Politicians from Rochester, New York
People from Brighton, Monroe County, New York
Democratic Party New York (state) state senators
Syracuse University alumni
University of Missouri alumni